The Miss Ecuador 2009 pageant was held on March 13, 2009. There were 21 candidates for the national title. The Miss Ecuador 2009 was Sandra Vinces from Manabí, she was crowned by Domenica Saporitti from Guayas. She represented Ecuador at Miss Universe 2009.

Results

Placements

Special awards

Contestants

Notes

Returns

Last compete in:

1999
 Cotopaxi
2001
 Chimborazo
2007
 Imbabura

Did not compete

Pichincha Karla Daniela Andrade Vásquez

Crossovers
Sylvana Yépez was in Reina de Vinces 2001, and Virreina de Los Ríos 2001.
María Jose Torres was in Reina de Ibarra 2003, and Reina de Imbabura 2003.
Gabriela Ulloa competed in Reina de Esmeraldas 2006, but unplaced.
Isabella Chiriboga competed in Reina de Quito 2007, and placed 1st Runner-up.
Renata Moreira was Reina de Santo Domingo 2008, and Reina de Mi Tierra 2008. Also she placed into top 6 in Miss Italia nel Mondo 2011.
Eliana Ayala is Reina de Ibarra 2009.

External links
Candidates

Miss Ecuador
2009 beauty pageants
Beauty pageants in Ecuador
2009 in Ecuador